Ian Jones (born 20 July 1932) is a former  Australian rules footballer who played with North Melbourne in the Victorian Football League (VFL).

Notes

External links 

Living people
1932 births
Australian rules footballers from Victoria (Australia)
North Melbourne Football Club players
Sandringham Football Club players